Nocera Terinese is a town and comune of the province of Catanzaro in the Calabria region of southern Italy.

In its territory, according to the last archaeological investigations, was located the ancient Greater Greece city of Terina.

See also
 Savuto river

References

Cities and towns in Calabria